Claudia Carolina Mariani Ambrueso (born August 11, 1972 in Buenos Aires) is a retired female judoka who represented Argentina in three consecutive Summer Olympics, starting in 1992, was flag bearer in 1996 being her last Olympic Game Sydney 2000.

Career
She claimed the bronze medal in the Women's Half-Lightweight (– 52 kg) division at the 1991 Pan American Games in Havana, Cuba and in 1999. She won silver at the 1995 World Judo Championships.

External links

1972 births
Living people
Argentine female judoka
Argentine people of Italian descent
Judoka at the 1992 Summer Olympics
Judoka at the 1996 Summer Olympics
Judoka at the 2000 Summer Olympics
Judoka at the 1991 Pan American Games
Judoka at the 1995 Pan American Games
Judoka at the 1999 Pan American Games
Olympic judoka of Argentina
Sportspeople from Buenos Aires
Pan American Games silver medalists for Argentina
Pan American Games bronze medalists for Argentina
Pan American Games medalists in judo
Universiade medalists in judo
Universiade medalists for Argentina
Medalists at the 1999 Summer Universiade
Medalists at the 1991 Pan American Games
Medalists at the 1999 Pan American Games
20th-century Argentine women
21st-century Argentine women